is a Japanese politician and member of the Liberal Democratic Party. Kaneko served as Minister of Agriculture, Forestry and Fisheries from October 2021 to August 2022. He has also represented the Nagasaki At-large district in the House of Councillors since his election in the July 2010 Councillors election. Kaneko is a native of Ikitsuki, Nagasaki and graduate of Keio University.

Political career
Kaneko first entered public office as a member of the Nagasaki Prefectural Assembly in 1975. He resigned during his third term in the assembly in 1983 to contest the national House of Representatives seat that was held at that time by his father Iwazō Kaneko. Genjiro came second in the Nagasaki No.2 district at the December 1983 general election, claiming one of the four seats represented by the district. Iwazō died at the age of 79 on 27 December 1983, 9 days after his son's election victory.

Kaneko retained his seat in the No.2 district at subsequent elections in 1986, 1990 and 1993. Following the electoral reforms of 1994, he became the member for the single-seat Nagasaki No.4 district at the 1996 general election. In 1998, during his 5th term in the House of Representatives, Kaneko resigned from the house to contest the Nagasaki gubernatorial election.

Kaneko served as the governor of Nagasaki Prefecture for three terms from 1998 until 2010. He chose not to seek a fourth term and publicly endorsed his deputy Hōdō Nakamura at the February 2010 gubernatorial election . Nakamura defeated Tsuyoshi Hashimoto, who had the endorsement of the Democratic, Social Democratic and People's New parties.

In October 2021, he became Minister of Agriculture, Forestry and Fisheries during the Kishida Cabinet.

References 
 

1944 births
Living people
Politicians from Nagasaki Prefecture
Keio University alumni
Members of the House of Representatives (Japan)
Members of the House of Councillors (Japan)
Governors of Nagasaki Prefecture